Barry Rumsey Smith (10 May 1933 – 27 June 2002) was a Christian preacher and author from New Zealand. Smith travelled extensively preaching throughout the Pacific, Australia, New Zealand, the United Kingdom and around the world. He wrote eight books with the theme of end times prophecy. His writings also appeared in his monthly newspaper Omega Times.

Biography
Barry Smith was a school teacher and had taught in New Zealand and the Pacific Islands. He left his employment to lecture on end time events and the lead up to the new world order. While in Western Samoa, he met May, a young Samoan woman who was to become his wife.

Smith was highly concerned about the New World Order, One World Government and the Mark of the Beast, which he believed would be achieved through some form of modern technology such as barcode tattoos, or a subcutaneous chip used to replace money, such as those currently being sold by VeriChip. He stated that he was not a prophet (more precisely that he had no supernatural prescient knowledge of further events) but that his analysis of global situations coupled with his understanding of biblical end-times prophecy led him to make predictions concerning near-future global events.

For Barry Smith, a one world government would be satanic and evil, a belief taken from his study of biblical prophecy.

He was strongly Anti-Masonic. He talked about the detail of the "great seal" on the US$1 bill, linking the symbolism to Freemasony, and the layout of certain landmark buildings in Washington DC in which he claimed could be found the Masonic square and compass, and the inverted pentagram.

Beliefs
Smith wrote several books (see details below) and gave regular public addresses, usually to audiences at churches both in major cities and small towns all around the world. His themes were principally Christian eschatology, conspiracy theory and a Christian evangelical message encouraging his audiences to accept Jesus Christ as their Saviour.

Many bold claims were made by Smith, both in his books and at his public meetings which were controversial. He preached and lectured using many anecdotes, many of which were not easy to independently verify. Frequently it was not clear through how many intermediaries a story had passed before reaching him and his audience.

Smith was a proponent of the 9/11 conspiracy theories, claiming that the 11 September attacks were orchestrated by the US federal government.

Australia and New Zealand
Barry Smith had given numerous talks in both Australia and New Zealand. He claimed that both countries were test cases in the new world order.
In one of his documentaries, Back Door to the New World Order he said that the Elite had chosen New Zealand to be the first test in their new world order plan, and what had begun in Europe with the secret societies had "finally burst into bud" in New Zealand.

Microchipping and RFID tracking

International
In an interview published in Challenge Weekly, a New Zealand Christian newspaper, Smith commented on the collapse of the world economy and that the mark of the beast was already being advertised around the world. His belief was that it was a tiny electronic radio frequency chip that was placed under the skin. He said that animals were being chipped and that there were plans to put them on humans.

Interviews
 Barry Smith put under fire by Philip Powell
 End Time Prophecy Interview with Barry Smith Part 1

Written works
Warning (1980), 
Second Warning (1985), 
Final Notice (1989), 
Postscript (1992), 
...Better Than Nostradamus (1996), 
The Devil's Jigsaw (1998) 
I Spy with My Little Eye (1999), 
Unlocking the Ultimate Secret (2002), 
Back Door to the New World Order by Barry Smith

Documentary and video
 Back Door to the New World Order
 Eye in the Triangle
 Update on the New World Order
 Mystery Babylon
 Final World Empire & One World Church
 This Generation
 Prophetic Update – New York & Washington DC
 New Millennium – The Third Day
 God’s Prophetic Calendar
 The 3 Frogs of Revelation
 Get the Right Message
 The Impact of Your Life
 Shake-Up Coming (1998)
 Why I Am A Christian (1998)
 Chaos of the Cults
 Scarlet Woman, One World Church
 The Occult & The Mystery of Iniquity
 Daniel 9, How Long Have We Got
 After Death, What?

See also
Dispensationalism
Covenantalism
Summary of Christian eschatological differences

References

External links
Smith / MS Life Media Website
Omega Times
Interview with Barry Smith (Part 1)
 
 
 Barry R Smith, RIP 1933 – 2002:  Evangelist, NWO – Barry Smith videos

1933 births
2002 deaths
20th-century apocalypticists
21st-century apocalypticists
9/11 conspiracy theorists
Christian conspiracy theorists
New Zealand evangelical leaders
New Zealand writers
New Zealand conspiracy theorists